Phra Siam Devadhiraj is a guardian deity personifying supernatural protection over the country of Thailand. The deity (deva, a sanskrit origin word, sometimes translated as "god" or "angel") is represented by an idol enshrined in the Phaisan Thaksin Throne Hall of the Grand Palace. It shows the deva in royal dress, holding a sword in the right hand and with the left hand at chest level in a blessing posture. The deity is worshipped in an annual private royal ceremony on the first waxing moon of the fifth Thai lunar month, which marks the traditional New Year in the Thai lunar calendar.

See also 
 National god
 Tutelary deity

References

Thai deities
Statues in Thailand
Thai monarchy
National personifications
Tutelary deities